Peter Shinkoda (born March 25, 1971) is a Canadian film and television actor who stars as Dai on the TNT science fiction series Falling Skies from Steven Spielberg and as Sektor in the Warner Bros. webseries Mortal Kombat: Legacy directed by Kevin Tancharoen. Shinkoda also starred as recurring villain Nobu Yoshioka on Seasons 1 and 2 of Marvel's Daredevil, which is distributed and viewable via Disney+.

Shinkoda has also starred as in films such as Midway (as Minoru Genda), Predator (as Dr. Yamada), War (as Harbor Yanagawa Shatei); I, Robot (as Detective Chin);  Paycheck and TV shows such as Hawaii Five-0 (as Alan Kim), Sanctuary (as Andy Fetz), Dark Angel (as Albino X), Stargate SG-1, Supernatural, The L Word (as Bryan Karikawa), Kingdom Hospital, Andromeda (as Burke), Cold Squad, Masked Rider and the original Mighty Morphin' Power Rangers (in both series as Ferrian).

Early life 
Peter Shinkoda was born March 25, 1971 in Montreal, Quebec, where he and his brother Michael were raised. Though family and friends encouraged him to be practical and pursue a career in engineering or medicine, he was focused on an entertainment career from a young age. His first attempt at acting came when he forced his parents to drive six hours to Toronto to attend an international casting call for the role of Short Round in Steven Spielberg’s film Indiana Jones and the Temple of Doom.  He did not get the part, and went on to focus on sports, excelling at hockey, skiing, football, baseball, soccer and judo.  He also studied classical piano and was identified as one of the top young pianists in Canada by the time he was 13 years old.

At 18, Shinkoda moved to Toronto to stay with relatives, but only stayed a year, leaving to attend the University of Western Ontario to pursue a Civil Engineering degree.  He began spending summers in Los Angeles and eventually made the transition to study Post Production for Film and Television at UCLA.

Career
After UCLA, Shinkoda went on to work as an assistant editor on such films as Romeo Must Die, Rat Race, Freddie Got Fingered and Saving Silverman, although he never finished any of the editing projects as acting assignments always arose to supersede them.  Shinkoda once studied acting at the East-West Players Conservatory, and earned a lead role in the Northwest Asian American Theater’s production of Exit the Dragon by Eric Michael Zee, produced by Ming-Na Wen.

Filmography

Film

Television

Web

References

External links 
 

Living people
Canadian male film actors
Canadian male television actors
Canadian male voice actors
Male actors from Montreal
1971 births
Canadian male actors of Japanese descent
20th-century Canadian male actors
21st-century Canadian male actors